December 10 - Eastern Orthodox liturgical calendar - December 12

All fixed commemorations below celebrated on December 24 by Eastern Orthodox Churches on the Old Calendar.

For December 11th, Orthodox Churches on the Old Calendar commemorate the Saints listed on November 28.

Saints
 Martyrs Terentius, Vincent, Emilian, and Bebaia, by the sword.
 Martyrs Peter the Acsetic, and Acepsimas, in Persia.
 Monk-martyr Barsabas, Abbot, of Ishtar, and ten companions, in Persia (342)
 Martyrs Aeithalas and Acepsius, at Arbela in Assyria (354)
 Saint Daniel the Stylite, of Constantinople (490)
 Martyr Mirax of Egypt (c. 640)
 Saint Nikephoros Phokas, Emperor of Byzantium (969)
 Saint Luke the New Stylite, of Chalcedon (979)

Pre-Schism Western saints
 Martyrs Victoricus, Fuscian, and Gentian (c. 287)
 Martyrs Thrason, Pontian and Praetextatus, in Rome under Diocletian, for ministering to Christian prisoners awaiting martyrdom (302)
 Saint Eutychius, a martyr called San Oye either in Mérida or else in Cádiz in Spain (4th century)
 Saint Sabinus of Piacenza, Bishop of Piacenza in Italy and a close friend of St Ambrose, renowned for miracles (420)
 Saint Cían, hermit in Wales (6th century)
 Saint Peris, the patron saint of Llanberis in Wales (c. 6th century)
 Saint Fidweten (Fivetein, Fidivitanus), a monk and disciple of St Convoyon in Redon in Brittany (c. 888)

Post-Schism Orthodox saints
 Venerable Nicon “the Dry” of the Kiev Caves (1101)
 Venerable Leontius, monk of Monemvasia in the Peloponnese (c. 1450)
 Venerable Damaskinos.
 Venerable Nomon the Wonderworker, of Cyprus.
 Saint Kuksha (Velichko), Hiero-Schemamonk of Odessa (1964)

New martyrs and confessors
 New Hieromartyr Theophan (Ilminsky), Bishop of Perm and Solikamsk, and with him two priests and five laymen, martyrs (1918).
 New Hieromartyr Nicholas Vinogradov, Priest (1937)
 New Hieromartyr John Bogoyavlensky, Priest (1941)

Other commemorations
 Synaxis of the Saints of Georgia.

Icon gallery

Notes

References

Sources 
 December 11/24. Orthodox Calendar (PRAVOSLAVIE.RU).
 December 24 / December 11. HOLY TRINITY RUSSIAN ORTHODOX CHURCH (A parish of the Patriarchate of Moscow).
 December 11. OCA - The Lives of the Saints.
 The Autonomous Orthodox Metropolia of Western Europe and the Americas (ROCOR). St. Hilarion Calendar of Saints for the year of our Lord 2004. St. Hilarion Press (Austin, TX). p. 92.
 December 11. Latin Saints of the Orthodox Patriarchate of Rome.
 The Roman Martyrology. Transl. by the Archbishop of Baltimore. Last Edition, According to the Copy Printed at Rome in 1914. Revised Edition, with the Imprimatur of His Eminence Cardinal Gibbons. Baltimore: John Murphy Company, 1916.
Greek Sources
 Great Synaxaristes:  11 ΔΕΚΕΜΒΡΙΟΥ. ΜΕΓΑΣ ΣΥΝΑΞΑΡΙΣΤΗΣ.
  Συναξαριστής. 11 Δεκεμβρίου. ECCLESIA.GR. (H ΕΚΚΛΗΣΙΑ ΤΗΣ ΕΛΛΑΔΟΣ). 
Russian Sources
  24 декабря (11 декабря). Православная Энциклопедия под редакцией Патриарха Московского и всея Руси Кирилла (электронная версия). (Orthodox Encyclopedia - Pravenc.ru).
  11 декабря (ст.ст.) 24 декабря 2013 (нов. ст.). Русская Православная Церковь Отдел внешних церковных связей. (DECR).

December in the Eastern Orthodox calendar